Philipp (Filip) Maximilian Opiz (5 June 1787 in Čáslav – 20 May 1858 in Prague) was a Czech-German forester and botanist.

Beginning in 1805 he served as a cameral-beamter in his hometown of Čáslav, later working in Pardubice (from 1808) and Prague (from 1814). In 1831 he became a Forstamtsconcipist (forestry official).

He was the taxonomic authority of numerous plant species, and the creator of many sets of exsiccatae. In 1830 Carl Borivoj Presl named the genus Opizia in his honor.

Principal works 
 Deutschlands cryptogamische Gewächse. Ein Anhang zur Flora Deutschlands von Joh. Christ. Röhling, 1817 - German cryptogams; Notes in regards to "Flora Deutschland" by Johann Christoph Röhling.
 Böheims phänerogamische und cryptogamische gewächse, 1823 - Bohemian phanerogams and cryptogams.
 Seznam rostlin květeny české, 1852, Inventory of Czech flora.

References

External links 

Czech botanists
19th-century German botanists
People from Čáslav
1787 births
1858 deaths
German Bohemian people